Werner Klemperer (March 22, 1920 – December 6, 2000) was an American actor. He was known for playing Colonel Wilhelm Klink on the CBS television sitcom Hogan's Heroes, for which he twice won the award for Outstanding Supporting Actor in a Comedy Series at the Primetime Emmy Awards in 1968 and 1969.

After serving in the United States Army during World War II, he began performing on the Broadway stage in 1947. Klemperer then appeared in several films during his early acting career such as The Wrong Man (1956), Judgment at Nuremberg (1961), and Houseboat (1958), and numerous roles on television shows such as Alfred Hitchcock Presents (1956), Perry Mason (1957), Maverick (1957), Gunsmoke (1958), The Untouchables (1960), and Have Gun Will Travel (1961), prior to his Hogan's Heroes role.

Early life
Klemperer was born in Cologne, Germany, to a musical family but he said that he had little musical aptitude. His father was renowned conductor Otto Klemperer and his mother was soprano Johanna Geisler. He had a younger sister named Lotte (1923–2003). His father was Jewish by birth; he converted to Catholicism but later returned to Judaism. His mother was Lutheran. His grandfather was part of the Jewish community in Prague, and his grandmother was a Sephardic Jew from Hamburg, Germany. Otto Klemperer was a first cousin of Victor Klemperer.

The Klemperer family immigrated to the United States in 1933, settling in Los Angeles, where Otto Klemperer became conductor of the Los Angeles Philharmonic (1933–1939). Werner Klemperer began acting as a student at University High School and enrolled in acting courses at the Pasadena Playhouse before joining the United States Army to serve in World War II. While stationed in Hawaii, he joined the Army's Special Services unit, spending the next years touring the Pacific entertaining the troops. At the war's end, he performed on Broadway before moving into television acting.

He broadened his acting career by performing as an operatic baritone and a singer in Broadway musicals.  He can also be heard as the Speaker in Arnold Schoenberg's Gurre-Lieder, in a 1979 live performance with the Boston Symphony Orchestra.

Career
Klemperer's first major film role was as a psychiatrist in Alfred Hitchcock's The Wrong Man (1956). Earlier that year in Death of a Scoundrel he had a smaller role as the lawyer of the hero/villain portrayed by George Sanders. He played a German government officer in the 1959 episode, "The Haunted U-Boat", of the series One Step Beyond. Also in 1959, he appeared as a Frenchman in the episode "Fragile" of the Western TV series Have Gun – Will Travel. He received significant notice for his role in the award-winning 1961 film Judgment at Nuremberg. The film presents a fictionalized account of the post-World War II Nuremberg trials, with Klemperer portraying Emil Hahn, a Nazi prosecutor and one of the defendants at the trial. Prior to this, he had a small role in the 1957 Errol Flynn film Istanbul and a pivotal part in the "Comstock Conspiracy" episode of Maverick that same year. He played the title role in the 1961 film Operation Eichmann, opposite his future co-star John Banner. He guest-starred in the first Brian Keith television series, Crusader, a Cold War drama that aired on CBS.  During this time, he made three guest appearances on Perry Mason:  he played East German murder victim Stefan Riker in the 1958 episode "The Case of the Desperate Daughter"; the East European character Ulrik Zenas in the 1963 episode "The Case of the Two-Faced Turn-a-bout"; and German Swiss Police Inspector Hurt in 1964 in "The Case of a Place Called Midnight".  In 1963, Klemperer also portrayed a professor of psychology in "The Dream Book", an episode on the sitcom My Three Sons.

Prior to Hogan's Heroes, Klemperer appeared in the 1956 episode 'Safe Conduct' of Alfred Hitchcock Presents, along with John Banner; twice appeared as Hugo on the syndicated romantic comedy series, How to Marry a Millionaire (1957–1959), with Barbara Eden and Merry Anders; and appeared on the "Purple Gang" episode of The Untouchables.

He is best known, however, as Colonel Wilhelm Klink: the bungling, cowardly, conceited, and self-serving Kommandant of Stalag 13 on Hogan's Heroes, which was broadcast on CBS from 1965 to 1971. Klemperer, conscious that he would be playing the role of a German officer during the Nazi regime, accepted the part only on the condition that Klink would be portrayed as a fool who never succeeded. According to co-star Richard Dawson, Klemperer supplied his own uniforms. When Klemperer's father, the famous conductor Otto Klemperer, saw his first episode of Hogan's Heroes, he said to his son, "Your work is good, but who is the author of this material?" In addition to the character's bumblings, Klink was also remembered for his excruciatingly bad violin playing. For his performance as Klink, Klemperer received six Emmy Award nominations for best supporting actor, winning successive awards in 1968 and 1969.

Klemperer made a cameo appearance in character as Klink in the Batman episode "It's How You Play the Game" and as Officer Bolix in the Lost in Space episode "All That Glitters" in 1966. He played a bumbling East German official in the 1968 American comedy film The Wicked Dreams of Paula Schultz, directed by George Marshall and starring Elke Sommer and several of his costars from Hogan's Heroes, including Bob Crane and John Banner. Klemperer later starred in Wake Me When the War Is Over in 1969, playing the role of a German major, Erich Mueller, alongside Eva Gabor. He also played a villain in an episode of Voyage to the Bottom of the Sea titled "The Blizzard Makers".

After Hogan's Heroes ended in 1971, Klemperer continued his career in stage and film roles and guest-starring roles on television. In 1987, he portrayed Herr Schultz in the Broadway revival of Cabaret. The role earned Klemperer a Best Featured Actor Tony Award nomination.

Later career

After his father's death in 1973, Klemperer expanded his acting career with musical roles in opera and Broadway musicals. He earned a Tony Award nomination for his performance in Cabaret in its 1987 Broadway revival. A member of the board of directors of the New York Chamber Symphony, Klemperer served as a narrator with many other American symphony orchestras including the Cincinnati Chamber Orchestra. He also made occasional guest appearances on television dramas, and took part in a few studio recordings, notably a version of Arnold Schoenberg's Gurre-Lieder with the Boston Symphony and Seiji Ozawa, in 1979. From 1979 to 1982, he appeared as Bassa Selim in 18 performances of Mozart's Singspiel Die Entführung aus dem Serail at the Metropolitan Opera in New York. In 1981, he appeared, to critical and audience raves, as Prince Orlofsky in Seattle Opera's production of Die Fledermaus. In 1990, he narrated the children's story "Gerald McBoing Boing" (music by Gail Kubik) for a CD of classical music for children. In 1992, he made a guest appearance in an episode of Law & Order, "Starstruck", as the father of an attempted murder suspect.

In 1993, Klemperer reprised the role of Klink in an episode of The Simpsons as Homer's guardian angel and spirit guide in the episode "The Last Temptation of Homer". According to the episode's DVD commentary, when Klemperer appeared, he had to be given a quick reminder of how to play Colonel Klink. He declined other offers to reprise the character, including one from talk-show host Conan O'Brien.

Klemperer appeared in several episodes of the news/talk show Politically Incorrect.

For many years, Klemperer was an elected member of the council of Actors' Equity Association, and was a vice president of the union at the time of his death.

Personal life
During World War II, Klemperer was stationed in Pearl Harbor where he acted opposite Kathryn Handloss. They became engaged. Since they were always being interviewed in the media they had a "secret code" to use in the media to let each other know they were looking for each other "should the events of the war separate" them.  They were, in fact, separated when Klemperer was sent on a South Pacific tour. In 1989 he came through San Francisco with a Shakespearean acting troupe. The San Francisco Chronicle did a full page interview of Klemperer. Ms. Handloss stated that Werner was using their "secret code."

Klemperer was the father of two children, Mark (born 1959) and Erika (born 1963), with his first wife, Susan Dempsay. On the set of Hogan's Heroes, he met his second wife, actress Louise Troy, who was making a guest appearance. They married in 1969, and divorced in 1975.

In 1997, Klemperer married his third wife, television actress Kim Hamilton, after dating her for 21 years. They remained married until Klemperer's death. Hamilton died 13 years later at age 81 on September 16, 2013.

Death
Klemperer died of cancer at his home in Manhattan on December 6, 2000, at the age of 80. He was cremated and his ashes were scattered at sea.

Filmography

References

External links

 
 
 
 
 Werner Klemperer papers, 1943–2001, held by the Billy Rose Theatre Division, New York Public Library for the Performing Arts
 Werner Klemperer at concentric.net (Wayback Machine)
 Klemperer's parents, Otto and Johanna, 1920s portrait by Nickolas Muray(Wayback Machine)
 Interview with Werner Klemperer, July 1985

1920 births
2000 deaths
20th-century American male actors
American male film actors
United States Army personnel of World War II
American male musical theatre actors
American operatic baritones
American male stage actors
American male television actors
Deaths from cancer in New York (state)
Outstanding Performance by a Supporting Actor in a Comedy Series Primetime Emmy Award winners
Actors from Cologne
People from the Rhine Province
United States Army soldiers
20th-century American male opera singers
People with acquired American citizenship
American people of German-Jewish descent
American people of Czech-Jewish descent
University High School (Los Angeles) alumni
German emigrants to the United States
Military personnel from California